Historically, the Ugrians or Ugors were the ancestors of the Hungarians of Central Europe, and the Khanty and Mansi people of the Khanty-Mansi Autonomous Okrug of Russia. The name is sometimes also used in a modern context as a cover term for these two peoples, formerly called "Ugrian Finns".

Modern languages
Although the Khanty and Mansi are closely related ethnographically, their languages are not particularly close. It is commonly posited that their languages are related to each other (as the Ob-Ugric languages) and also to the language of the Magyars of Hungary (together forming the Ugric language family). While all three of these languages are clearly members of the greater Uralic language family, the linguistic reconstruction work needed to prove that they are closer to each other than to other Uralic languages has never been adequately done, and in recent decades a more agnostic position has been taken by many linguists. (See Uralic languages#Classification.)

See also
 Yugra
 Onogurs

References

Ugric peoples